Marie-Ange Magne (née Faintrenie; born 20 November 1987) is a French politician representing La République En Marche! who was elected Member of Parliament in the National Assembly on 18 June 2017, representing Haute-Vienne's 3rd constituency.

Early life 
She was born in Limoges.

Political career 
She stood down at the 2022 French legislative election, and was succeeded by Manon Meunier from La France Insoumise.

See also
 2017 French legislative election

References

Living people
1987 births
People from Limoges
Deputies of the 15th National Assembly of the French Fifth Republic
La République En Marche! politicians
21st-century French women politicians
Women members of the National Assembly (France)

Members of Parliament for Haute-Vienne